Anika Kabir Shokh is an Bangladesi actress, dancer and model. Shokh started her modeling career 2002. She started acting on TV in year 2008 by acting in Redoan Rony's TV serial FnF: Friends & Family. She debut in film Bolo Na Tumi Amar alongside Shakib Khan, her 2nd film Olpo Olpo Premer Golpo with co-star Niloy. She is also a brand ambassador of Banglalink.

Media works

Bangladeshi model Anika Kabir Sokh became popular to Bangladeshi media, through her performance in Banglalink Desh Television commercial. Shakh acted in several television Bengali dramas named 'FNF', 'Fifty Fifty', 'Diba Ratri Khola Thake', 'Rong', and "College" directed by Pallab Bishwash.

She played a leading role in several television commercials outside Bengali drama namely 'BD Gura Moshola', 'Uro Lemon', 'Toshin Fan', and 'Banglalink'. Her first Bengali movie was 'Bolona Tumi Amar'. Later on she has been working in many dramas and telefilms.

Filmography

Dramas

Notes

References

Living people
Bangladeshi film actresses
Bangladeshi television actresses
21st-century Bangladeshi actresses
Year of birth missing (living people)